Serine/threonine-protein kinase SMG1 is an enzyme that in humans is encoded by the SMG1 gene. SMG1 belongs to the phosphatidylinositol 3-kinase-related kinase protein family.

Function 

This gene encodes a protein involved in nonsense-mediated mRNA decay (NMD) as part of the mRNA surveillance complex. The protein has kinase activity and is thought to function in NMD by phosphorylating the regulator of nonsense transcripts 1 protein. Alternative spliced transcript variants have been described, but their full-length natures have not been determined.

Interactions 

SMG1 (gene) has been shown to interact with PRKCI and UPF1.

References

Further reading 

 
 
 
 
 
 
 
 
 
 
 
 
 
 

EC 2.7.11
Genes on human chromosome 16